The 2020–21 Northern State Wolves men's basketball team represents Northern State University in the 2020-21 NCAA Division II men's basketball season. The Wolves are led by second year head coach Saul Phillips and play their home games at Wachs Arena in Aberdeen, South Dakota. They compete as members of the Northern Sun Intercollegiate Conference. Due to the COVID-19 pandemic, their season was greatly shortened.

Previous season
Following the departure of Paul Sather to North Dakota, Saul Phillips was hired as the head coach of the Wolves. During his first year, the Wolves went 26–6 (18–4 NSIC) and won both the NSIC regular season championship, but the NSIC tournament championship as well, which gave them the #4 seed in the 2020 NCAA Division II men's basketball tournament, which was eventually cancelled due to the COVID-19 pandemic.

Roster

Schedule and results

|-
!colspan=12 style=| Non-conference regular season

|-
!colspan=12 style=| NSIC regular season

|-
!colspan=12 style=| NSIC Tournament

|-
!colspan=12 style=| NCAA DII Tournament

|-

References

Northern State Wolves men's basketball seasons
Northern State
Northern State Wolves
Northern State Wolves